The following is a list of international prime ministerial trips made by Khaleda Zia during her second term as Prime Minister of Bangladesh from 2001 to 2006, as well as visits made during her first term between 1991 to 1996.

1992

1995

2002

2004

2005

2006

References 

Trips
Lists of diplomatic trips
Diplomacy-related lists
21st century in international relations
Bangladesh prime ministerial visits